The 2021 Ole Miss Rebels football team represented the University of Mississippi in the 2021 NCAA Division I FBS football season. The Rebels played their home games at Vaught–Hemingway Stadium in Oxford, Mississippi, and competed in the Western Division of the Southeastern Conference (SEC). They were led by second-year head coach Lane Kiffin. This was the first season in program history that the team finished the regular season with 10 wins.

Previous season
The Rebels finished the 2020 season 5–5, 4–5 in SEC play to finish in fifth place in the Western Division. The Rebels were invited to the Outback Bowl where they defeated No. 11 Indiana.

SEC Media Days
In the preseason media poll, Ole Miss was predicted to finish 4th in the West Division.

Regular season

Schedule

Schedule Source:

Rankings

Game summaries

vs. Louisville

No. 17 (FCS) Austin Peay

Tulane

at No. 1 Alabama

No. 13 Arkansas

at Tennessee

LSU

at No. 18 Auburn

Liberty

No. 11 Texas A&M

Vanderbilt

at Mississippi State

vs. No. 7 Baylor (Sugar Bowl)

Coaching staff

References

Ole Miss
Ole Miss Rebels football seasons
Ole Miss Rebels football